Koottukar (Friends) is a 2010 Indian Malayalam-language action thriller film directed by Prasad Vaalacheril, starring Vinu Mohan and Bhama.

Plot
Chandradas, an advocate receives a phone call during his birthday party regarding a business deal from Unnikrishnan, who then kills him when they meet. Antony Alex, Unni's childhood friend, attempts to arrest him and his underworld ally Masthan Bhai, but Masthan's right-hand man Mahmmed shows up and saves them. Masthan tells Mahmmed not to kill Alex and promises to surrender once Unni has completed his revenge. Alex becomes Commissioner of Police and visits Father Varghese Chembanthotti, who tries to make contact with Unnikrishnan through Bhai, but fails.

Later, Unni visits his old house and reminisces his past. His father Krishnan, an honest taxi driver, had wanted his son to be a police officer, and Unnikrishnan had passed his exams and was selected for IPS training. He was also in love with a woman named Achu, whom both families expected him to marry.

But one day, Krishnan was attacked by a drunk man named Kannan. Unni fought the attacker off; however, Kannan's father, S. P. Somasundaram, ordered police officer Rajan to take Krishnan and Unni into custody and beat them. Rajan and his accomplice Narayanan tortured the pair, and in the process, Krishnan gets killed. Afterwards, Unni was falsely convicted of killing a police officer and sent to prison. Achu, at Unni's urging, went along with her parents' plans and married someone else. Unni's mother and sister were raped by Rajan and Narayanan; the women committed suicide.

In jail, Unni was attacked by another prisoner, but Masthan intervened and saved him. Masthan revealed that Somasundaram and Kannan had betrayed him to customs in a smuggling deal. That was the point at which Unnikrishnan and Masthan became friends and allies.

Back in the present, Unni kills those who have ruined his life one by one, with Masthan's and Mahmmed's assistance, but the mission to kill Kannan goes wrong. Kannan reveals that Masthan was his killer before he dies, and Somasundaram begins a manhunt, though Somasundaram stabs Masthan to death before he can be captured. Unni then pays a last visit to Father Varghese and asks the priest to pray for him. Meanwhile, Somasundaram takes Mahmmed into custody and uses his confession to arrest Unni.

In the final act, Aswathy successfully prosecutes Unni, who is sentenced to death. After the verdict, Aswathy commits suicide. Unni manages to escape from custody, but only temporarily; as the police shoot him down, Somasundaram is accidentally killed by Alex. Unni dies in Father Varghese's arms with Alex by his side.

Cast 
Vinu Mohan as Unnikrishnan
Bhama as Achu
Shankar as Masthan Bhai
Anoop Chandran as Father Varghese Chembanthotti
Saiju Kurup as Antony Alex
Sreelatha Namboothiri
Devan as Krishnan
Urmila Unni as Devaki
Ambika Mohan as Achu's mother
Narayanankutty as Abookka
Kalashala Babu as Chandradas
Santhosh as Kozhi Rajan
Kollam Ajith as Narayanan
Mamukkoya as Ikka

Soundtrack
 "Chendumalli Thazhvarayil" - sung by Unnimenon and Sujatha, lyrics by Pulikkottil Hydarali, music by Sam Thomas
 "Inshah Allah" - sung by G. Venugopal, lyrics by Bichu Tirumala, music by S. P. Venkitesh
 "Unnikkurulukhal" - sung by M. G. Sreekumar, lyrics by Tirumala, music by Venkitesh
 "Madhuvoorum Ennazhakhe" - sung by Madhu Balakrishnan, lyrics by Vasu Areekkodu, music by Venkitesh

References

 Film audio
 Koottukar Official Website
 Nowrunning article
 CompleteMovie article
 Koottukar article at MalluMovies
 Discuss about Kootukar Malayalam movie

External links
 

2010 films
2010s romantic action films
2010s Malayalam-language films
Indian romantic action films